Jehu (meaning "Yahu is He";  Ya'úa [ia-ú-a]) was the tenth king of the northern Kingdom of Israel since Jeroboam I, noted for exterminating the house of Ahab. He was the son of Jehoshaphat, grandson of Nimshi, and possibly great-grandson of Omri, although the latter notion is not supported by the biblical text. His reign lasted for 28 years.

William F. Albright has dated his reign to 842–815 BCE, while E. R. Thiele offers the dates 841–814 BCE. The principal source for the events of his reign comes from 2 Kings.

Biblical narrative

Proclamation as king 
The reign of Jehu's predecessor, Jehoram, was marked by the Battle of Ramoth-Gilead against the army of the Arameans. Jehoram was wounded and returned to Jezreel to recover. He was attended by Ahaziah, king of Judah, who was also his nephew, son of his sister Athaliah. Meanwhile, according to the writer of the Book of Kings, the prophet Elisha ordered one of his students to go to Ramoth-Gilead and separate Jehu, who was a military commander at the time, from his companions. There, he was to anoint Jehu as king in an inner chamber and explain to him that he was to act as an agent of divine judgement against the house of Ahab. The student followed these instructions, and upon completion he ran away. Jehu initially dismissed the student as being a "madman", but nonetheless told his companions about his anointing. His companions later enthusiastically blew their trumpets and proclaimed him their king.

Jezreel and the deaths of Jehoram and Jezebel 

With a chosen band, Jehu planned his conspiracy against King Jehoram and secretly entered Jezreel. King Jehoram tried to flee, but Jehu shot an arrow which pierced his heart. Jehu later threw his body on Naboth's vineyard, to avenge Naboth, whom Jehoram's father and mother had murdered. King Ahaziah fled after seeing Jehoram's death but Jehu wounded him. Ahaziah, nonetheless, managed to flee to Megiddo, where he died.

Jehu proceeded to enter the premises of the palace at Jezreel. Jezebel watched him with contempt from the palace window and mockingly compared him to King Zimri. Jehu later commanded Jezebel's eunuchs to throw her out of the palace window. They obeyed his commands and Jezebel was instantly killed. Jehu trampled over her body, but when he decided later to arrange a proper burial due to her royal descent, only her skull, hands and feet remained. The rest of her body had been eaten by dogs.

Now master of Jezreel, Jehu wrote to command the chief men in Samaria to hunt down and kill all of the royal princes. They did as ordered, and the next day they piled the seventy heads in two heaps outside the city gate, as Jehu commanded. Ahab's entire family was slain. Shortly afterwards, Jehu encountered the forty-two "brothers of Ahaziah" (since the brothers of Ahaziah had previously been taken away and probably killed by the Philistines, these must have been relatives of Ahaziah in a broader sense, like nephews and cousins) at "Beth-eked of the shepherds". They told Jehu that they were visiting the royal family. Jehu, however, killed them all at "the pit of Beth-eked".

Following Jehu's slaughter of the Omrides, he met Jehonadab the Rechabite and convinced him that he was pro-Yahwist. Jehonadab quickly allied with him and they entered the capital together. In control of Samaria, he invited the worshippers of Baal to a ceremony, then trapped and killed them. After that, he destroyed their idols and temple, and turned the temple into a latrine.

Reign 
Other than Jehu's bloody seizure of power and his tolerance for the golden calves at Dan and Bethel (condemned as the "corrupted" version of Yahwism by biblical writers), little else is known of his reign. He was hard pressed by Hazael, king of the Arameans, who defeated his armies "throughout all of the territories of Israel" beyond the Jordan river, in the lands of Gilead, Gad, Reuben, and Manasseh.

This suggests that Jehu offered tribute to Shalmaneser III, as depicted on his Black Obelisk, in order to gain a powerful ally against the Arameans. Bit-Khumri was used by Tiglath-Pileser III for the non-Omride kings Pekah (733) & Hoshea (732), hence House/Land/Kingdom of Omri could apply to later Israelite kings not necessarily descended from Omri. According to others this description should be taken very literally, as in this period Assyrians were very closely following the events in this area, with control slipping in later years. 

The destruction of the house of Ahab is commended by the author of 2 Kings as a form of divine punishment. Yahweh rewards Jehu for being a willing executor of divine judgement by allowing four generations of kings to sit on the throne of Israel. Jehu and his descendants Jehoahaz, Jehoash, Jeroboam II and Zachariah ruled Israel for 102 years. Nonetheless, according to the Book of Hosea, the House of Jehu was still punished by God through the hands of the Assyrians for Jehu's massacre at Jezreel, some Biblical commentators reasoning that this was because Jehu's motives may not have been entirely pure in his massacre.

Archaeological evidences

Black Obelisk 

Aside from the Hebrew Scriptures, Jehu appears in Assyrian documents, notably in the Black Obelisk where he is depicted as kissing the ground in front of Shalmaneser III and presenting a gift (maddattu ša Ia-ú-a...kaspu mâdu "tribute of Jehu...much silver"). In the Assyrian documents, he is simply referred to as "son of Omri" (possibly expressing his having been the ruler of 'the House of Omri,' a later Assyrian designation for the Kingdom of Israel). This tribute is dated 841 BCE. It is the earliest preserved depiction of an Israelite.

According to the Obelisk, Jehu severed his alliances with Phoenicia and Judah, and became subject to Assyria.

Tel Dan Stele 
The author of the Tel Dan Stele (9th century BCE, found in 1993 and 1994) claimed to have slain both Ahaziah of Judah and Jehoram of Israel (whom Ahaziah was visiting). Some contend the author of this monument is Hazael of the Arameans, although 2 Kings 9 specifically mentions it was Jehu who killed Ahaziah and Jehoram after being anointed King of Israel by a young prophet sent by the Prophet Elisha.

The author may have been Jehu according to Dr. David Miano in his presentation, "Who Wrote the Tel Dan Inscription?" at a conference of the Save Ancient Studies Alliance in 2021 (available on YouTube).

In popular culture 
Jehu is portrayed by George Nader in the film Sins of Jezebel (1953). 

Drive Like Jehu was an American post-hardcore band from San Diego active from 1990 to 1995. The band's name was derived from 2 Kings 9:20: "And the watchman told, saying, He came even unto them, and cometh not again: and the driving [is] like the driving of Jehu the son of Nimshi; for he driveth furiously". 

"Jehu's Rebellion" is the eighth chapter in Manga Messengers (2011), the penultimate installment in the six volume Manga Bible (2006-19).

See also
List of biblical figures identified in extra-biblical sources

Sources and notes

External links
Jehu Jewish Encyclopedia

810s BC deaths
9th-century BC Kings of Israel
Regicides
Biblical murderers
Leaders who took power by coup
House of Jehu
Gilead